Mladen Tepavčević (Serbian Cyrillic: Младен Тепавчевић; born October 26, 1976 in Sarajevo, Yugoslavia) is an Olympic swimmer from Serbia. He swam for Serbia and Montenegro at the 2004 Olympics. He also qualified to represent Serbia at the 2008 Olympics, however, he did not swim.

Tepavčević holds the Serbian record in all men's breaststroke events  (50-m 0:28.10; 100-m 1:02.60 and 200-m 2:22.54). He has competed for Serbia and Montenegro at the 2004 Summer Olympics in Athens, Greece in the 100 m breaststroke, where he registered a time of 1:03.52, enough for an overall 29th position out of 60 swimmers.

He qualified for the 2008 Summer Olympics with the 1:02.80 he swam for 33rd at the 2007 World Aquatics Championships in the 100 m breaststroke.

He also swam at the 2003 and 2005 World Championships.

See also
 List of Serbian records in swimming

References

1976 births
Living people
Serbian male swimmers
Male breaststroke swimmers
Swimmers at the 2004 Summer Olympics
Olympic swimmers of Serbia and Montenegro